Claudio Martini (born 10 January 1951) is an Italian politician who is the former president of Tuscany.

Biography 
Born in Le Bardo, Tunisia, from two parents from Livorno, Martini began his career in the Prato section of the Italian Communist Youth Federation.

In 1985 Martini was elected local secretary of the Italian Communist Party in Prato, and in 1989 he was appointed Mayor, carrying out several important projects for the Tuscan city, including the creation of the Province of Prato in 1992.

At the 1995 regional election, Martini was elected Regional councilor, supporting the candidate of centre-left coalition Vannino Chiti, and was appointed Regional Assessor for Healthcare.

President of Tuscany 
At the 2000 regional election, Martini was the candidate of centre-left coalition as President of Tuscany, and managed to get elected, defeating former Minister and House of Freedom candidate Altero Matteoli. He later manages to seek re-election at the 2005 regional election, holding his seat as governor until 2010.

Senator 
At the 2013 general election, Martini was elected Senator for the Democratic Party. He is not candidated at the 2018 general election.

References

External links 
Files about his parliamentary activities (in Italian): XVII legislature

1951 births
Living people
Italian Communist Party politicians
Democratic Party of the Left politicians
Democrats of the Left politicians
Democratic Party (Italy) politicians
20th-century Italian politicians
21st-century Italian politicians
Mayors of Prato
Presidents of Tuscany